Afro-Latinos or Afro–Latin Americans are those residents of Latin America who are descended from African slaves brought to Latin America and the Caribbean region during the trans-Atlantic slave trade, who made up 95% of all Africans brought to the Americas.Afro-Brazilians, Afro-Cubans, Afro-Dominicans, Afro-Hondurans, Afro-Panamanians, Afro–Puerto Ricans, Afro-Colombians, and other Latin Americans are descended from these African slaves.The first Africans brought to the New World arrived on the island of Hispaniola (now divided between the Dominican Republic and Haiti). The majority were taken to Brazil. Only 5% of the Africans brought to the Americas went to North America, from whom African Americans are descended.

Notable Afro–Latin Americans and Afro-Latinos

 40 Cal (real name is Calvin Alan Byrd) – American rapper, member of Harlem-based hip-hop group The Diplomats
 Jose Acevedo – Venezuelan track-and-field athlete
 Elizabeth Acevedo – poet
 Miguel Algarín – poet
 Roberto Alomar – former Major League Baseball player, regarded highly as a second baseman
 Laz Alonso – American film and television actor, best known for playing Tsu'tey in James Cameron-directed sci-fi film Avatar and Fenix Calderon in the film Fast & Furious 
Anitta (singer) – Brazilian singer, half Afro-Brazilian
 La La Anthony – former MTV VJ, television personality and actress, wife of NBA basketball player Carmelo Anthony
 Karan Ashley  – American actress and talk show host, best known for her role as Aisha (Yellow Ranger) on Mighty Morphin Power Rangers
 Taís Araújo – Brazilian actress and model
 Eva Ayllón – composer and singer
 AZ – rapper
 Cardi B – rapper 
 Josefina Báez – performance artist, theater director, poet, educator, and writer
 Lloyd Banks – rapper
 Ivan Barias – Dominican music producer and songwriter
 Jean-Michel Basquiat – artist, musician
 Swizz Beatz – rapper, producer
 Aloe Blacc – American singer-songwriter
 Elijah Blake – singer-songwriter 
 Ariana Brown – poet
 Karamo Brown
 J.I the Prince of NY – Puerto Rican rapper
 Julia de Burgos – poet and activist for Puerto Rican independence
 Ursula Burns – business executive
 Miguel Cabrera – Venezuelan baseball player
 Ilia Calderón – journalist
 Tego Calderón – reggaeton singer-songwriter, rapper, and actor
 Mariah Carey – American musician and actress
 John Carlos – former track and field champion, best known for his 1968 Olympics Black Power salute
 Matt Cedeño – actor and former model
 Orlando Cepeda – former Puerto Rican baseball player
 Keshia Chanté – Canadian singer
 Aroldis Chapman – Cuban baseball player
 Hugo Chavez – former Venezuelan President
 Roberto Clemente – former Puerto Rican baseball player
 Jesús Colón – author, founder of Nuyorican movement
 Ismael Cruz Córdova – Puerto Rican actor
 Kid Cudi – rapper
 Celia Cruz – Cuban salsa singer and performer (1925-2003)
 Victor Cruz – football player and former NFL wide receiver for the New York Giants
 Wilson Cruz – actor
 Yaya DaCosta – American model
 Rosario Dawson – actress and musician
 Kristinia DeBarge – American singer
 Ariana DeBose  – singer and actress
 Melissa De Sousa – actress
 Sylvia del Villard – actress, dancer, choreographer and activist 
 Carlos Delgado – former Puerto Rican baseball player
 Kat DeLuna – musician 
 Rocsi Diaz – American model and former BET television personality (106 & Park)
 Samantha Diaz – singer-songwriter (American Idol)
 Graciela Dixon – former Chief Justice of the Supreme Court of Panama
 Rudy Duthil – advertising executive
 Sheila E. – American percussionist and singer
 Dave East – rapper
 Dina Ruiz Eastwood – reporter and actress
 Alfred Enoch – actor
 Arlen Escarpeta – Belizean-born actor, best known for playing Sam Walker in the television drama American Dreams
 Adriano Espaillat – New York congressman
 Sandra María Esteves – poet
 Fabolous – rapper
 Antonio Fargas – actor
 Cheo Feliciano – Puerto Rican singer of salsa and bolero music
 Leonel Fernández – former President of the Dominican Republic
 Tony Fernández – former Dominican baseball player
 Dom Flemons – American musician and singer-songwriter
 Brian Flores - Honduran-American NFL Head Coach (Miami Dolphins 2019-2021) 
 Juan Flores – historian, professor, Afro-Latino Studies scholar
 Shaggy Flores – poet and writer
 Arian Foster – NFL football player, running back for the Houston Texans
 Antonio Fresco – DJ, record producer and radio personality
 Kevin Gates – rapper
 O.T. Genasis – Garifuna American rapper 
 Gilberto Gil – Brazilian singer, political activist and former Minister of Culture
 Aracelis Girmay – poet
 Meagan Good – American actress
 Herizen Guardiola – actress and singer
 Gunplay – rapper
 Edward W. Hardy – composer and musician
 Severiano de Heredia – Cuban-born French politician, president of the municipal council of Paris from 1879 to 1880, first mayor of African descent of a Western world capital
 Al Horford – Dominican basketball player and is the son of Tito Horford
 Sunny Hostin – American lawyer, journalist, and television host (The View)
 Gwen Ifill – journalist, television newscaster and author
 Iza – Brazilian pop singer
 Ro James – singer
 Reggie Jackson – baseball player
 Shar Jackson – American actress, best known for her role as Niecy Jackson on the UPN sitcom Moesha
 Skai Jackson – American actress
 Jharrel Jerome – actor, best known for his role in Moonlight
 Julissa – former BET television personality (106 & Park)
 Kelis – singer-songwriter
 Tori Kelly – American musician
 Erick Kolthoff – Associate Justice of the Supreme Court of Puerto Rico
 Lisa "Left Eye" Lopes – member of R&B girl group TLC (1971-2002)
 Amara La Negra – singer
 Toña la Negra – singer
 Tato Laviera – poet
 Kiana Ledé – American singer and actress
 Jorge Lendeborg Jr. – actor
 Selenis Leyva – actress
 Adriana Lima – model
 Olivia Longott – American singer
 Sessilee Lopez – model 
 Faizon Love – Cuban-born actor and comedian
 Héritier Lumumba – Australian footballer of Afro-Brazilian descent
 La Lupe – singer
 Maluca Mala – singer and rapper
 EJ Manuel – NFL quarterback
 Kalimba Marichal – Mexican singer
 Juan Marichal – former Dominican baseball pitcher
 Toya Martin – American singer
 Pedro Martínez – former Dominican baseball pitcher
 Tony Medina – poet and graphic novelist
 Jesús Papoleto Meléndez – poet
 Miguel – singer-songwriter
 Christina Milian – singer and actress
 E. Ethelbert Miller – writer and poet 
 Minnie Miñoso – former Cuban baseball player
 Carlos Moore – Cuban writer, journalist and activist
 Aja Monet – poet
 Naima Mora – model (America's Next Top Model)
 Benny Moré – Cuban singer, bandleader and songwriter
 Nancy Morejón – Cuban poet, critic, essayist
 Lamorne Morris – actor
 Rico Nasty – rapper
 N.O.R.E. – rapper
 Amaury Nolasco – actor
 Lupita Nyong'o – Kenyan-Mexican actress
 Soledad O'Brien – broadcast journalist, executive producer and philanthropist
 Don Omar – reggaeton singer-songwriter and actor
 Claudette Ortiz – singer (City High)
 David Ortiz – Dominican baseball player
 Ozuna (real name is Juan Carlos Rosado) – Puerto Rican Reggaeton and Latin trap singer
 Johnny Pacheco – Dominican musician, founder of the Fania All-Stars, coined the term "Salsa" 
 Peedi Peedi – rapper
 Tony Peña – former Dominican baseball player
 Willie Perdomo – writer and poet
 Jacob "Princeton" Perez – singer and dancer (Mindless Behavior)
 Rosie Perez – actress, dancer, choreographer, director and community activist
 Miguel Piñero – playwright and poet, co-founder of the Nuyorican Poets Café
 Dascha Polanco – Dominican actress, best known for her role as Dana Diaz in the Netflix dramedy Orange is the New Black
 Reagan Gomez-Preston – American actress
 Princess Nokia – rapper
 Albert Pujols – Dominican baseball player
 Dania Ramirez – actress
 Manny Ramirez – Dominican baseball player
 Charles Rangel – former New York congressman
 Judy Reyes – actress
 Lais Ribeiro – model
 Lauren Ridloff – American deaf actress
 Mychal Rivera – football player, tight end, Oakland Raiders
 Naya Rivera – American actress, best known for her role as Santana Lopez in the musical comedy Glee (1987-2020)
 Alex Rodriguez – Dominican-American baseball player
 Pete "El Conde" Rodríguez – Puerto Rican salsa singer
 Sabi – singer-songwriter
 Zoe Saldana – actress
 Manny Sanguillén – former Panamanian baseball player
 Juelz Santana – rapper
 Antony Santos – Dominican bachata singer
 Neymar Jr – Brazilian footballer
 Mayra Santos-Febres – poet
 Romeo Santos – singer
 Jon Secada – singer
 Arturo Alfonso Schomburg – Puerto Rican historian, writer, and activist in the United States; founder of the Schomberg Center for Black Research
 Sech (singer) – Panamanian Reggaeton artist
 Shyne – Belizean rapper
 Luis Guillermo Solís – Costa Rican president and mulatto
 Pop Smoke – American rapper of Afro-Panamanian descent (1999-2020)
 Esperanza Spalding – musician
 Arlenis Sosa – model
 Sammy Sosa – former Dominican baseball player
 Vince Staples – rapper
 Jeremy Suarez – former child actor
 Schoolboy Q – American rapper
 Cecilia Tait – politician and former volleyball player
 Arnaldo Tamayo Méndez – Cuban cosmonaut
 Lorenzo Thomas – poet
 Piri Thomas – creative writer
 Tessa Thompson – American actress
 Anuel AA – Puerto Rican Reggaeton artist born to an Afro-Puerto Rican father and White Puerto Rican mother
 Melody Thornton – singer-songwriter and dancer (The Pussycat Dolls)
 Luis Tiant – former MLB starting pitcher, Cleveland Indians and Boston Red Sox
 Gina Torres – actress
 Trina – American female rapper
 Karl-Anthony Towns – Dominican-American basketball player
 María Urrutia – former weightlifter, athlete and politician
 Salvador Valdés Mesa – First Vice President of Cuba, former trade union leader, Political Bureau of the Communist Party of Cuba
 Amirah Vann – actress
 Danielle Vega – actress
 Lauren Velez – actress
 Cassie Ventura – American singer and actress
 Johnny Ventura – Dominican singer
 Tristan Wilds – actor and singer
 Hype Williams – music video director
 Juan Williams – journalist and political analyst
 Joaquín Zihuatanejo – poet
 Daddy Yankee – Puerto Rican Reggaeton artist and pioneer in Reggaeton music born to an Afro-Puerto Rican father and White Puerto Rican mother
 Krisean Lopez

See also 
Lists of people:
List of Afro-Argentines
List of Afro-Bolivians
List of Brazilians of Black African descent
List of Afro-Cubans
List of Afro-Chileans
List of Afro-Colombians
List of Afro-Dominicans
List of Afro-Ecuadorians
List of Afro-Mexicans
List of Afro-Nicaraguans
List of Afro-Panamanians
List of Afro-Peruvians
List of Afro-Puerto Ricans
List of Afro-Uruguayans
List of Afro-Venezuelans
 Afro-Latin Americans
 African diaspora
 African diaspora in the Americas
 List of topics related to Black and African people

References 

Ethnic groups in Central America
Ethnic groups in Latin America
Ethnic groups in North America
Ethnic groups in South America
Ethnic groups in the Caribbean
Afro-Latinos
African